The Cathedral Basilica of the Assumption of the Blessed Virgin Mary  also called Białystok Cathedral is a Roman Catholic cathedral in the city of Bialystok in Poland. It was designed by architect Józef Pius Dziekoński. The three-nave church is 90 meters long and can accommodate 9,500 worshipers. The two towers reach 72.5 meters high. It is the main church of the Archdiocese of Bialystok and acquired the status of basílica in 1985 by decision of Pope John Paul II.

The predecessor of the present cathedral was a Renaissance church was built between 1617 and 1626. In the late 19th century, the number of parishioners had grown to 12,000 people, while the old church was only room for 1,000 worshipers. The Catholics under Czarist Russia were not allowed to build a new church. However, permission was obtained to increase the old parish church. In 1900 they started next to the old church building a neo-Gothic church, designed by Józef Pius Dziekoński. On 17 September 1905, the church was consecrated by the Bishop of Vilnius.

Between 1996 and 2004 the church was restored.

See also
Roman Catholicism in Poland
Assumption Cathedral (disambiguation)

References

Roman Catholic cathedrals in Poland
Roman Catholic churches in Białystok
Roman Catholic churches completed in 1905
Basilica churches in Poland
20th-century Roman Catholic church buildings in Poland
The Most Holy Virgin Mary, Queen of Poland